Dirk Nicolaas Lotsij, sometimes spelled as Dirk Lotsy (3 July 1882 in Dordrecht – 27 March 1965 in The Hague), was a Dutch amateur footballer who competed in the 1912 Summer Olympics. He was included in the Netherlands national football team, which won the bronze medal.

Biography
In 1902 he was part of one of the infamous "Van Hasselt XI" sides that faced the Belgium national team in a series of unofficial meetings between the two sides in the early 1900s, netting his side's consolation goal in a 1–2 loss on 15 December 1902. 

On 30 April 1905, Lotsij went down in history as one of the eleven footballers who played in the first-ever game of the Dutch national team at the Coupe Vanden Abeele, helping his side to a 4–1 victory over Belgium in Antwerp. Lotsij then had to wait four years before earning another cap for the Dutch, which was again in a 4–1 win against Belgium on 25 April 1909.

Without playing in any other game, he was called up to the Dutch Olympic squad in 1912, starting in all four matches as a midfielder (three of which as the team captain), including the bronze medal match against Finland in which he helped his team with a 9–0 win to not only secure a second bronze medal in a row, but also was a record-breaking victory for the Netherlands at the time.

It took him two more years for Lotsij to score his first and last international goal in a friendly against Germany on 5 April 1914 to help his side salvage a 4–4 draw. He played his last match for the team six weeks later, on 17 May 1914, in a friendly against Denmark.

International
Netherlands
'''Olympic Games Bronze medal: 1912

References

External links
 
 

1882 births
1965 deaths
Dutch footballers
Footballers at the 1912 Summer Olympics
Olympic footballers of the Netherlands
Olympic bronze medalists for the Netherlands
Netherlands international footballers
Footballers from Dordrecht
Olympic medalists in football
Medalists at the 1912 Summer Olympics
Association football midfielders